Texas Ranger is a stand-alone novel.

Plot
This novel's main character is Texas Ranger Rory Yates. Anne, the ex-wife of Yates, has been receiving death threats. She asks Yates to return to her home, because she is scared. Before Yates can return someone murders Anne in a brutal fashion. Yates is asked to stay away from the case, but he unofficially searches for the killer. Before Yates can find the murderer, this killer strikes again.

Reviews
Ed Godfrey, in a review in The Oklahoman, liked Texas Ranger, saying, "If you like your murder mysteries with an Old West feel, Texas Ranger is worth your time." Chris Gray, in a review in The Houston Chronicle, only somewhat liked this novel. Author James Pattersonin a story in The Dallas Morning News talked about this book and why he wrote it. Patterson said, "I haven't written about the area too much, but I enjoyed doing this because it was different. I like to challenge myself and get into a territory where I haven't spent much time as a storyteller." In October 2018 Variety reported that CBS was basing a drama series on Patterson's novel.

References

2018 American novels
Novels by James Patterson
Little, Brown and Company books